Jerry Seinfeld is the title character and the main protagonist of the American television sitcom Seinfeld (1989–1998). The straight man among his group of friends, this semi-fictionalized version of comedian Jerry Seinfeld was named after, co-created by, based on, and played by Seinfeld himself. The series revolves around Jerry's misadventures with his best friend George Costanza, neighbor Cosmo Kramer, and ex-girlfriend Elaine Benes. He is usually the voice of reason amid his friends' antics and the focal point of the relationship.

In contrast to the series' supporting characters, he rarely runs into major personal problems. Jerry is the only main character on the show to maintain the same career (a stand-up comedian, like the real Seinfeld) throughout the series. He is the most observational character, sarcastically commenting on his friends' quirky habits. Much of the show's action takes place in Jerry's apartment located in New York City at 129 West 81st Street, apartment 5A (3A in seasons 1 and 2).  He and his friends also frequently have coffee or meals together at Monk's Café.

Jerry appeared in all 180 episodes of Seinfeld (including several two-part episodes) and is the only character in the show to do so.

Personality

In the show's setting, Jerry is the straight man, a figure who is "able to observe the chaos around him but not always be a part of it." Plot lines involving Jerry often concern his various relationships – Jerry often finds stupid reasons to break up with women.

Jerry is generally indifferent to what goes on in his friends' lives, seeing their misery as merely an entertaining distraction, as well as an opportunity for joke material. He often plays along with their hare-brained schemes, even encouraging them, often just to see them fail. In the episode "The Serenity Now", Jerry is perplexed by his experience of crying, asking "What is this salty discharge?" In "The Foundation" Elaine points out that he has "never felt remorse." He will often nonchalantly state, "That's a shame" when something bad happens. A recurring joke is Jerry behaving unchivalrously towards Elaine, such as not helping her carry groceries or heavy objects, ignoring her when she is upset, and taking a first class upgrade on a flight for himself, leaving Elaine in economy. Jerry, George and Elaine all share a general trait of not letting go of other character's remarks and going to great lengths to be proven right. In one episode, Jerry rents a house in Tuscany, just because Elaine's boyfriend told him there weren't any available (though he claims that he never wanted to actually rent the house, but only wanted to know if he theoretically could rent one).

Despite his usual indifference to his friends and their actions, Jerry apparently is very satisfied with his life, and feels worried about anything that might threaten the group lifestyle. In "The Invitations", for example, Jerry admits that he feels depressed about George getting married, seeing as how George will eventually leave the group and Jerry will never see him again. Once Elaine tells him that she is also "getting out" of the group, Jerry becomes so worried about a near future of just him and Kramer that he unknowingly almost walks into a car while crossing the street. In "The Bizarro Jerry", Jerry also grows panicky about losing the group dynamic when Kramer becomes too busy with his job and Elaine temporarily leaves to join the Bizarro group, claiming that "The whole system's breaking down!" In a deleted scene from the episode "The Letter", he claims that his friends are "not more important" than his girlfriends, but "they're as important."

Unlike George and Elaine, Jerry rarely runs into major personal problems. In "The Opposite", this tendency is explicitly pointed out, as Jerry goes through a number of experiences after which he invariably "breaks even", even as his friends are going through intense periods of success or failure. In "The Rye", during a particularly trying time for Elaine, she angrily tells Jerry, "You know, one of these days, something terrible is going to happen to you. It has to!" Jerry simply replies, "No, I'm going to be just fine." Many of the problems he does run into are the result of the actions of his nemesis Newman, a postal worker. In the series finale, Jerry's streak of getting away with things is broken when he, and the rest of the group, are arrested for their indifference toward a mugging victim and sentenced to jail after multiple witnesses testify to their poor character.

However, Kramer persuades Jerry to do things that he's reluctant to do. In several arguments with Jerry, Kramer is incredibly stubborn, protecting his own interests.

Jerry always wears a suit whenever he has to do his stand-up comedy act. Like George, Jerry's hairstyle remains relatively unchanged throughout the series.

As in real life, Jerry is a fan of comic book characters, particularly of Superman. He often holds earnest discussions about the character and relates his friends' situations to concepts and characters from the Superman world. A Superman statue is a regular fixture of his apartment.

Jerry is very successful financially, and occupationally stable in comparison with his friends. He never seems to be at a loss for money, in comparison to both George and Elaine, whose careers go through both highs and lows. Throughout the series Jerry suffers numerous financial and material losses, but these do not seem to have long-term impacts on his situation. For example, Jerry buys his father a Cadillac Fleetwood and in "The Money" buys it back after his parents sell it, spending over $20,000. In "The Apartment", it is revealed that Jerry could easily lend Elaine $5,000 for an apartment. Despite his apparent financial security, his parents offer to pay for everything when they visit him (even if they have no money, as seen in "The Watch") and occasionally urge him to find a new job.

Jerry has an obsessive insistence on cleanliness and neatness. In "The Pothole", Jerry inadvertently knocks his girlfriend's toothbrush into the toilet bowl, and after she uses it, he is unable to bring himself to kiss her. As revenge, she puts one item of his in the toilet without telling him what it was; a distraught Jerry, thinking it could be anything, ends up throwing away virtually every item in his apartment in panic. Elaine suggests that his cleanliness verges into a serious disorder. In "The Voice", he throws out a belt because it touched the edge of a urinal. In "The Couch", after Poppie's gastrointestinal disorder causes him to urinate on Jerry's couch, Jerry, rather than having the cushion cleaned, gives the couch away.

Background
Jerry and George grew up in New York City. George recalls in "The Outing" that the two were friends ever since an encounter in gym class in their school days. In "The Betrayal", Jerry mentions that he once beat George up in the fourth grade. Flashbacks in episodes such as "The Library" portray Jerry and George in high school. A pizza place which they frequented is portrayed in "The Frogger". Jerry and George attended school together at Edward R. Murrow Middle School, John F. Kennedy High School and Queens College.

After college, Jerry briefly worked as an umbrella salesman and claims to have invented the "twirl" to make the umbrella look more attractive. He eventually quit the job in order to focus more on his comedy career.

Family
Jerry's parents are Morty and Helen Seinfeld, a retired Jewish couple living in Florida. Unlike George, who usually can't stand his parents, Jerry gets along reasonably well with his parents, but he still prefers they live in Florida rather than New York, so that they do not interfere with his private life (a “buffer zone”). Although born and raised Jewish and he considers himself a Jew, Jerry apparently does not practice and generally does not observe many traditions. In "The Bris", he implies he is circumcised, repeatedly asking people if they have "ever seen one" - in reference to an uncircumcised penis. He also mentions having a sister in the episode "The Chinese Restaurant", though she is never named, never appears on screen, and is never mentioned again after this episode. In order to avoid his old friend Joel in "Male Unbonding", Jerry pretends to have promised to tutor his nephew; it is unclear if the nephew really exists or is simply fabricated as part of the excuse.

Jerry has an eccentric uncle, Leo, who appears in 15 episodes. Uncle Leo has a son, Cousin Jeffrey, who works for the parks department, about whom he constantly talks, but who never appears. In "The Stake Out", Jerry speaks of an uncle named Mac, as well as a cousin named Artie Levine. In "The Truth", Jerry mentions a cousin named Douglas who has an addiction to Pepsi. In "The Pony Remark", Helen, Morty, Jerry, Elaine and Leo attend a 50th-anniversary party for Manya and Isaac, an elderly couple whose relationship to Jerry is never explicitly defined. Manya is described as a Polish immigrant. In the same episode, Jerry references having an Aunt Rose, and Helen mentions a family member named Claire who is getting married. In "The Soup" episode, Jerry mentions an Aunt Silvia, whom he compares to Elaine in terms of conversation.

Jerry's maternal grandmother, Nana, is an elderly woman with memory problems, occasionally unable to tell the past from the present, living alone in the city. Nana makes appearances in "The Pledge Drive", "The Kiss Hello" and "The Doodle".

Relationships
Jerry has a detached approach towards relationships and breaks up with women for the most minor of reasons. According to the ninth-season DVD release of the series, Jerry has had 73 different girlfriends seen or alluded to over the course of the series.

Elaine
Jerry and Elaine had a long-term relationship prior to the beginning of the series. During the first two seasons, this past relationship continues to impact their friendship. In "The Stake Out", Jerry's attempts to flirt with another woman in front of Elaine creates awkwardness between them. In "The Deal", they create a set of rules whereby they can sleep together but remain only friends. However, by the end of the episode, the two decide to be a couple again. Subsequent episodes show them as comfortably in the role of friends, and Seinfeld creators Larry David and Jerry Seinfeld later admitted that they simply forgot that "The Deal" ended with Jerry and Elaine as a couple.

In "The Mango", Jerry is upset at learning that Elaine faked all her orgasms while they were together. The fact causes such problems between the two, that Elaine and Jerry have sex together in an effort to save their friendship.

In "The Serenity Now", Jerry's emotions come flooding out after being locked up inside him. He confesses love for Elaine and proposes to her. Later, the horrifying tale of George's life frightens him back into his formerly nonchalant demeanor and he takes back his proposal, much to Elaine's dismay since she was willing to get married.

In "The Finale", Jerry and Elaine are on an airplane going through major turbulence. Believing they're about to die, Elaine yells out "Jerry, I've always loved..." but the plane stabilizes before she can finish the sentence. Later, Jerry asks Elaine what she was going to say, to which she replies "I've always loved United Airlines".

In the reunion episode featured in Season 7 of Curb Your Enthusiasm, it is revealed in the years since the finale Jerry has donated sperm to Elaine that results in her having a daughter, who's taken to calling Jerry "Uncle Jerry", but by the episode's end, it is said she now refers to him as "Daddy," to Jerry and Elaine's clear discomfort.

Long-term relationships
Other than Elaine, Jerry has only dated a few other women for more than one episode:
 He starts dating Vanessa in "The Stake Out" and breaks up with her in "The Stock Tip" during an uncomfortable weekend trip to Vermont.
 In Season 4, he dates Marla, a virginal woman in the closet business, in "The Virgin" and "The Contest" and Tia, a model, in "The Airport" and "The Pick". Marla dumps him when she learns of the infamous "contest" while Tia breaks up with him when she appears to witness Jerry picking his nose (when he was simply scratching it). 
 He dates Dolores (whose name he forgets, guessing it to be Mulva, having the clue that it rhymes with a part of the female anatomy) in "The Junior Mint" and "The Foundation" (Season 4 then Season 8).
 He dates Rachel in "The Raincoats" (a two-part episode), "The Hamptons", and "The Opposite". Rachel ends the relationship, but Jerry, who always "breaks even", doesn't become upset, and is confident that he will find another girlfriend.
 He becomes engaged to his "perfect" girlfriend, Jeannie, in the Season 7 finale, "The Invitations". In the first Season 8 episode, "The Foundation", Jerry tells Elaine that he had a perfectly mutual break-up with Jeannie over the summer.

Newman
Jerry has a long-running hatred of Newman, describing him as his "sworn enemy" in "The Andrea Doria" and showing general contempt for him at their every meeting. Newman usually reciprocates, although at other times he seems quite pleased by Jerry's hostility, as if it is a testimony to his effectiveness at irritating him. The origin of their feud is never explained.

Jerry's snide greeting for him, "Hello, Newman", becomes a trademark of their relationship. Jerry wants to be rid of Newman so badly that he once even helped him on his postal route so that he could get a prized transfer to Hawaii ("The Andrea Doria").

Despite their antagonistic relationship, Jerry and Newman have ended up working in unison on rare occasions. In "The Sniffing Accountant", Jerry worked with Kramer and Newman to find out if their accountant was on drugs. Certain instances would even define their relationship as one of friendship, or at least mutual tolerance, built around their shared friend, Kramer. In "The Bottle Deposit" he has no qualms about leaving Kramer and Newman alone in his apartment, trusting they'll "keep an eye on one another."

Reception
In 2007, Entertainment Weekly placed the Jerry Seinfeld character eighth on their list of the "50 Greatest TV icons". For his portrayal, Jerry Seinfeld was nominated four times for the Golden Globe Award for Best Actor in a Television Series – Musical or Comedy, out of which he won one, along with being nominated five times for the Primetime Emmy Award for Outstanding Lead Actor in a Comedy Series, for which he never won.

References

Author surrogates
Fictional left-handed character
Fictional American Jews
Television characters introduced in 1989
Fictional comedians
Cultural depictions of actors
Seinfeld characters
American male characters in television